The 2019 Fresno State Bulldogs football team represented California State University, Fresno in the 2019 NCAA Division I FBS football season. The Bulldogs were led by third year head coach Jeff Tedford and played their games at Bulldog Stadium as a member of the Mountain West Conference in the West Division. They finished the season 4–8, 2–6 in Mountain West play to finish in a three-way tie for fourth place in the West Division.

On December 6, head coach Jeff Tedford resigned citing health reasons. He finished at Fresno State with a three-year record of 26–14.

Previous season

The Bulldogs finished the season 12–2 overall 7–1 in Mountain West Play to win the West division for a 2nd straight year. They defeated the Boise State in the Mountain West Conference Championship Game. They were invited to the Las Vegas Bowl where they defeated Arizona State.

Preseason

Mountain West media days
The Mountain West media days will be held on July 23–24 at the Cosmopolitan on the Las Vegas Strip.

Media poll
The preseason poll was released at the Mountain West media days on July 23, 2019. The Bulldogs were predicted to finish in first place in the MW West Division.

Schedule

Game summaries

at USC

Minnesota

Sacramento State

at New Mexico State

at Air Force

UNLV

Colorado State

at Hawaii

Utah State

at San Diego State

Nevada

at San Jose State

Players drafted into the NFL

References

Fresno State
Fresno State Bulldogs football seasons
Fresno State Bulldogs football